Sextans A (also known as UGCA 205) is a small dwarf irregular galaxy. It spans about 5000 light-years across, and is located at 4.3 million light-years away, in the outskirts of the Local Group of galaxies, which includes the Milky Way galaxy, and to which Sextans A may or may not belong.

Sextans A has a peculiar square shape. Massive short-lived stars exploded in supernovae that caused more star formation, triggering yet more supernovae, ultimately resulting in an expanding shell. Young blue stars now highlight areas and shell edges high in current star formation, which from the perspective of observers on Earth appears roughly square. The 10.4m telescope Gran Telescopio Canarias recently observed the OB-type stars that power the giant HII regions.

See also 
 Sextans B

References

External links
 

Irregular galaxies
Dwarf galaxies
Low surface brightness galaxies
NGC 3109 subgroup
Sextans (constellation)
29653
UGCA objects